The Alberta Aviation Museum is an aviation museum located in Edmonton, Alberta, Canada. The museum is located on-site at the former Edmonton City Centre (Blatchford Field) Airport on the southwest corner of the field (11410 Kingsway Avenue).

The museum operates daily except for Christmas Day, Boxing Day and New Years Day.

History 
The Alberta Aviation Museum is housed in the historic Hangar 14, the last remaining example of a 'double-double' Second World War British Commonwealth Air Training Plan (BCATP) hangar. These hangars, built for the BCATP across Canada, were made of pre-cut wooden timbers of British Columbia fir. They could be built as single units, double units, and the 'double-double' which is four units.

Hangars were built on the site from 1939 to 1942, including 3 double hangars for RCAF Station Edmonton, with one of the hangars originally opened 5 October 1940 as No. 2 Air Observers School (AOS) under the command of Wop May. After the United States entered the Second World War the airport was used to service United States Army Air Forces (USAAF) aircraft heading to Alaska until the new USAAF base that was to become CFB Namao (now CFB Edmonton) opened outside of Edmonton and absorbed some of the traffic. Following the war in 1946, Hangar 14 was used by No. 418 (City of Edmonton) Reserve Squadron, Pacific Western Airlines and for Distant Early Warning Line (DEW Line) construction before becoming a car dealership in the late 1960s.

Known in Edmonton as "The Hangar on Kingsway", it has been designated 'M' Hangar, Hangar #6 and later Building #14 by the Edmonton City Airport. Hangar 14 was designated a Provincial Historic Resource under the Historical Resources Act on July 4, 2000, and a Municipal Historic Resource by the City of Edmonton on August 31, 2004.

Current
The building has been designated as a municipal and provincial historic resource. Despite its historic resource status, a recent motion put forward by City administration has revealed that the hangar is in need of structural upgrades, and requires a minimum of forty-one million dollars for repairs by 2027. It was initially motioned by administration that the building be de-accessioned from the city's heritage properties, which could result in the museum having to move (despite renewing a 25-year lease in 2018). Councilor Anne Stevenson countered this with a motion to propose a two-year timeline to determine creative solutions for the building with the end goal of the museum remaining where it is.  The Alberta Aviation Museum is currently working with the City to determine a plan forward. 

A grassroots Facebook Group titled "Save Edmonton's Hangar 14" has been started for anyone interested in supporting the campaign and keeping the city accountable to their word to find solutions to have the museum remain at the site.

The museum hosts several groups including the 504 Blatchford Field Squadron, Royal Canadian Air Cadets, the 180 (20th Field Artillery Regiment, RCA) Royal Canadian Army Cadets, 700 (City of Edmonton) Wing, Royal Canadian Air Force Association, and 418 (City of Edmonton) Squadron Association, and CASARA.

Collection

Aircraft

Helicopters

Gallery

Affiliations
The museum is affiliated with:Alberta Museums Association, Canadian Aeronautical Preservation Association, Canadian Museums Association, Canadian Heritage Information Network, Edmonton Heritage Council and Virtual Museum of Canada.

References

External links 

Alberta Aviation Museum

Aviation history of Canada
Aerospace museums in Alberta
Museums in Edmonton
Aviation in Edmonton